The Wyoming United States House election for 1894 was held on November 6, 1894. Republican Frank Wheeler Mondell defeated Democratic incumbent Henry A. Coffeen and Populist Shakespeare E. Sealey with 52.64% of the vote making Coffeen the second incumbent Representative from Wyoming to lose reelection.

Results

References

1894
Wyoming
1894 Wyoming elections